Día de muertos ("Day of the Dead"), also known as Día de difuntos and Los hijos de la guayaba, ("The Children of the Guava") is a 1988 Mexican comedy-drama film directed by Luis Alcoriza. It is Alcoriza's penultimate film as director and his last one made entirely in Mexico; his last film directed, La sombra del ciprés es alargada, was a Mexican-Spanish co-production.

Plot
In a cemetery on the Day of the Dead, the lawyer Talamantes is going to place a cross on his mother's grave. There, he meets with other assistants who commemorate his relatives: a bricklayer, a poet, the shoemaker Zacarías, the plumber Baltazar and the hairdresser Pedro, with their respective families. In the heat of alcohol, they all argue, show their weaknesses, resolve disagreements in couples, fight, flirt, reconcile and swear each other eternal friendship.

Cast
Pedro Weber as Baltazar (as Pedro Weber "Chatanuga")
Manuel "Flaco" Ibáñez as Zacarías
Carmen Salinas as Cholita
Adalberto Martínez as The Thief (as Adalberto Martinez "Resortes")
María Rojo as Yolanda
Sergio Ramos as Pedro (as Sergio Ramos "El Comanche")
Patricia Rivera
Ernesto Gómez Cruz as The Poet
Leticia Perdigón as Martha
Edgardo Gazcón as Salvador
Eugenia Avendaño as Enriqueta
Fernando Luján as Francisco de Jesús Talamantes
Raúl Araiza as Beto
Héctor Suárez

Analysis
In an interview collected in the book Memorias de posguerra: Diálogos con la cultura del exilio by Manuel García García, director Luis Alcoriza described his film thus, "[L]a película salió muy dura. Era una agresión frontal al sistema y a la moral dominante. Había una burla agresiva a la muerte que superaba la crítica común del mexicano." ("The movie came out very hard. It was a frontal assault on the dominant system and morals. There was an aggressive mockery of death that surpassed the common criticism of the Mexican.") He added, "La gente se asustó un poco. La peícula es divertida pero con un fondo violento. Abordé el tema de la figura de la madre de manera muy frontal y eso aquí no está bien visto." ("People got a little scared. The movie is funny but with a violent background. I approached the subject of the figure of the mother in a very frontal way and that here is not well seen.")

See also
 Day of the Dead

References

External links
 

1988 films
1980s Spanish-language films
1988 comedy-drama films
Mexican comedy-drama films
Films directed by Luis Alcoriza
Day of the Dead films
1980s Mexican films